Daneel is a surname. Notable people with the surname include:

George Daneel (1904–2004), South African rugby player
Pieter Daneel (born 1987), South African cricketer and businessman

See also
Daneels
Daniel
R. Daneel Olivaw, fictional character